The Icelandic Music Awards are the official annual music awards given in Iceland to commemorate the musical achievements of the year.

The award was established in 1993 with an annual rock award given by the Félag íslenskra hljómlistarmanna (FÍH) (Union of Icelandic Musicians); since then, it has developed into a multi-category event held usually in January or February for awards of the previous year.

Since 2002, the event has been sponsored by the Icelandic Music Association known as Samtónn.

Winners

1993
Winners:
Song of the Year: "Stúlkan" by Todmobile
Album of the Year: Spillt by Todmobile
Performer / Band of the Year: Todmobile
Singer of the Year (male): Daníel Ágúst Haraldsson
Singer of the Year (female): Björk Guðmundsdóttir
Keyboard Player of the Year: Eyþór Gunnarsson
Bass Player of the Year: Eiður Arnarsson
Drummer of the Year: Gunnlaugur Briem
Guitar Player of the Year: Guðmundur Pétursson
Instrumentalist of the Year (other instruments): Sigtryggur Baldursson (percussion)
Songwriter of the Year: Þorvaldur Bjarni Þorvaldsson
Lyricist of the Year: Andrea Gylfadóttir
Cover of the Year: "Starlight" by Jet Black Joe
Best Newcomer: Orri Harðarson
Honorary: Björgvin Halldórsson

2004
Winners:
Record of the Year: Mugimama, is this monkey music? by Mugison
Music video of the Year: "Oceania" by Björk
Best Export: Bang Gang and Barði Jóhannsson
Honorary: Helga Ingólfsdóttir (harpsichord)
Motivational recording: Ágúst Einarsson for the book Hagræn áhrif tónlistar
Rock and pop:
Best Pop Album: Mugimama, Is This Mugimusic? by Mugison
Best Rock Album: Hljóðlega af stað by Hjálmar
Best Album: Vetrarljóð' by Ragnheiður Gröndal
Singer of the Year (male): Páll Rósinkranz
Singer of the Year (female): Ragnheiður Gröndal
Performer / Band of the Year: Jagúar
Song of the Year: "Murr Murr" by Mugison
Best Newcomer: Hjálmar
Classical and contemporary:
Composition of the Year: Sinfónía by Þórð Magnússon
Record of the Year: Verk fyrir selló og píanó - Bryndís Halla Gylfadóttir (cellist) and  Edda Erlendsdóttir (piano) and Enescu, Janacek, Kodaly, Martinu
Performer of the Year: Bryndís Halla Gylfadóttir (cellist)
Newcomer: Víkingur Ólafsson (piano)
Jazz:
Record of the Year: Dansaðu fíflið þitt dansaðu! by Sammi, Tómas R and Jagúar
Composition of the Year: Ástin by Tómas R. Einarsson (Dansaðu fíflið þitt dansaðu)
Jazz Artist of the Year: Samúel Jón Samúelsson and Jagúar

2006
Winners: 
Music video of the Year: "The One" by Trabant
Best album art: Please Don't Hate Me by Lay Low
Best Newcomer: Elfa Rún Kristinsdóttir
Útrásarverðlaun Reykjavíkur Loftbrú: Ghostigital
Motivational: FL Group
Honorary: Ólafur Gaukur Þórhallsson
Most Popular Song of the Year: "Barfly" by Jeff Who?
Popular Performer of the Year: Lay Low
Classical and Contemporary:
Record of the Year: Þorlákstíðir by Voces Thules
Performer of the Year: Víkingur Ólafsson (piano)
Composition of the Year: "Fiðlukonsert" by Áskell Másson
Jazz:
Record of the Year: Atlantshaf by Atlantshaf
Performer of the Year: Útlendingahersveitin
Song of the Year: "Líf" by Einar Valur Scheving
Various styles:
Pop Record of the Year: Dirty Paper Cup by Hafdís Huld
Rock and Alternative Record of the Year: Wine for My Weakness by Pétur Ben
Popular Record of the Year: Aparnir í Eden by Baggalútur
Other music Record of the Year: In Cod We Trust by Ghostigital
Performer of the Year: Björgvin Halldórsson
Song of the Year: "Allt fyrir mig" by Baggalútur and Björgvin Halldórsson
Singer of the Year (male): Bubbi Morthens
Singer of the Year (female): Lay Low

2007
Winners:
Best Newcomer: Hjaltalín
Best film / television music: Pétur Ben for ForeldrarBest Music Video of the Year: "The Great Unrest" by Gísli Darri & Bjarki Rafn with Mugison
Album Art of the Year: Alli Metall, Kjartan Hallur & Mugison for Mugison album MugiboogieNetverðlaun by tonlist.is: Páll Óskar
Popular Artist of the Year by visir.is: Páll Óskar
Útflutningsverðlaun: Kvartett Sigurðar Flosasonar & Jóels Pálssonar
Motovational: Björgólfur Guðmundsson
Honorary: Rúnar Júlíusson
Classical and contemporary:
Best Record of the Year: Melódía by Kammerkórinn Carmina
Best Composition of the Year: "Apochrypha" by Hugi Guðmundsson
Bets Artist of the Year: Kammersveitin Ísafold
Jazz:
Best Record of the Year: Cycles by Einar Scheving
Best Artist of the Year: Sigurður Flosason (saxophone)
Best Composition of the Year: "Daboli"	by Agnar Már Magnússon 
Various music styles:
Pop Record of the Year: Frágangur/Hold er mold by Megas and Senuþjófarnir
Rock / Alternative Record of the Year: Mugiboogie by Mugison
Record of the Year: "Við & við" by Ólöf Arnalds
Artist of the Year: Björk
Song of the Year: "Verum í sambandi" by Snorri Helgason / Bergur Ebbi Benediktsson
Songwriter of the Year: Högni Egilsson (from Hjaltalín)
Lyricist of the Year: Bergur Ebbi Benediktsson (Sprengjuhöllin)
Singer of the Year (male): Páll Óskar
Singer of the Year (female): Björk

2008
Selected winners:
Best songwriter: Sigur Rós for Með suð í eyrumBest Composition of the Year: ORA by Áskell Másson
Song of the Year: "Þú komst við hjartað í mér" by Toggi, Bjarki Jónsson & Páll Óskar
Singer of the Year: Páll Óskar Hjálmtýsson
Best Newcomer: Agent Fresco
Motivational: Músíktilraunir
Jazz Record of the Year: Fram af by Ómar Guðjónsson
Classical and contemporary music Record of the Year: Fordlandia by Jóhann Jóhannsson
Pop / Rock Record of the Year: Með suð í eyrum við spilum endalaust by Sigur Rós
Performer of the Year: Anna Guðný Guðmundsdóttir (piano) on Tuttugu tillit til Jesúbarnsins (Olivier Messiaen)
Music Video of the Year: "Wanderlust" by Björk Guðmundsdóttir / Encyclopedia Pictura
Umslag ársins: Demoni Paradiso by Evil Madness
Netverðlaun tónlist.is: Baggalútur
Útrásarverðlaun: Mugison
Popular Performer of the Year: Baggalútur
Honorary: Ingólfur Guðbrandsson

2014
Held at Harpa on 14 March 2014.

Selected winners:
 Record of the Year: Komdu til mín svarta systir by Mammút
 Song of the Year: "Salt", Mammút
 Female Singer of the Year: Sigríður Thorlaciu (Hjaltalín)
 Male Singer of the Year: John Grant
 Songwriter of the Year: John Grant
 Band of the Year: rock band Skálmöld
 Honorary prize: Mezzoforte

2015
Held at Harpa (concert hall) in February 2015.

Winners:
 Album cover of the year: Kippi Kanínus—Temperaments. Designed by: Ingibjörg Birgisdóttir and Orri Jónsson
 Music video of the year: Úlfur Úlfur—Tarantúlur. Director: Magnús Leifsson. 
 Producer of the year: Jóhann Jóhannsson – The Theory Of Everything Album of the year: The Theory Of Everything – Jóhann Jóhannsson
 Honorary Award: The Sugarcubes
 Rock & pop:
 Album of the year, rock: In The Eye Of The Storm—Mono Town
 Album of the year, pop: Sorrí—Prins Póló
 Song of the year, rock: "Peacemaker"—Mono Town
 Song of the year, pop: "Color Decay"—Unnar Gísli Sigurmundsson (Júníus Meyvant)
 Male vocalist, rock & pop: Valdimar Guðmundsson (Valdimar)
 Female vocalist, rock & pop: Salka Sól Eyfeld (AmabAdamA)
 Music performer, rock & pop: Skálmöld
 Music event of the year, rock & pop: Skálmöld and the Iceland Symphony Orchestra at Eldborg
 Lyricist, rock & pop: Snæbjörn Ragnarsson (Skálmöld)
 Songwriter, rock & pop: Svavar Pétur Eysteinsson (Prins Póló)
 Newcomer Album Of The Year, rock & pop: n1—Young Karin
 Brightest Hope, rock & pop: Júníus Meyvant
Jazz & blues:
 Newcomer Album Of The Year, jazz & blues: Anna Gréta Sigurðardóttir 
 Song of the Year, jazz & blues: Sveðjan –  ADHD 
 Album of the Year, jazz & blues: Íslendingur í Alhambrahöll – Stórsveit Reykjavíkur
 Composer of the Year, jazz & blues: Stefán S. Stefánsson 
 Performer of the Year, jazz & blues: Sigurður Flosason
 Event of the Year, jazz & blues: Jazzhátíð Reykjavíkur / Jazzfestival Reykjavík
Contemporary & classical:
 Event of the Year, contemporary & classical: Sumartónleikar Skálholtskirkju
 Singer of the Year (Male), contemporary & classical: Elmar Gilbertsson
 Singer of the Year (Female), contemporary & classical: Hanna Dóra Sturludóttir
 Album of the Year, contemporary & classical: Fantasíur G.P. Telemann, Violin Solo – Elfa Rún Kristinsdóttir
 Song of the Year, contemporary & classical: Ek ken di nag – Daníel Bjarnason
 Composer of the Year, contemporary & classical: Daníel Bjarnason for Blow Bright & Ek ken di nag Performer of the Year, contemporary & classical: Víkingur Heiðar Ólafsson
 Newcomer of the Year, contemporary & classical: Oddur Arnþór Jónsson

2016
Held at Harpa (concert hall) in March 2016.

Selected winners:
 Rock Album of the Year: Destrier, Agent Fresco
 Pop Album of the Year: Vulnicura, Björk
 Rock Song of the Year: "Way We Go Down", Kaleo
 Pop Song of the Year: "Crystals", Of Monsters and Men
 Male Vocalist of the Year: Arnór Dan
 Female Vocalist of the Year: Björk
 Live Performer of the Year: Of Monsters and Men
 Music Event of the Year: Iceland Airwaves
 Lyricist of the Year: Björk
 Best Newcomer in Rock and Pop: Sturla Atlas

2017
Held 2 March 2017.

Selected winners:
 Performer of the year, jazz and blues: Stórsveit RVK
 Performer of the year, pop/rock: Emmsjé Gauti
 Performer of the year, classical/contemporary music: Schola Cantorum
 Concert of the year, pop/rock: Baggalútur Christmas concert
 Concert of the year, classical/contemporary music: Évgení Onegin in the production of the Icelandic Opera
 Pop song of the year: Hildur, "I'll Walk with You"
 Rock song of the year: Valdimar, "Slétt og fellt"
 Rap/hip hop song of the year: Emmsjé Gauti, "Silfurskotta"
 Jazz composition of the year: ADHD, Magnús Tryggvason Elíassen
 Classical/contemporary composition of the year: Hugi Guðmundsson, Hamlet in Absentia
 The brightest hope in jazz/blues: Sara Blandon
 The brightest hope in pop/rock: Auður
 Album of the year, electronic music: Samaris, Black Night Album of the year, rap/hip hop: Emmsjé Gauti, Vagg og Velta Album of the year, jazz/blues: Þorgrímur Jónsson Quintet, Constant Movement Album of the year, rock: Kaleo, A/B Album of the year, pop: Júníus Meyvant, Floating Harmonies''

References

External links

European music awards